Kommuri Sambasiva Rao (1926–1994) was a Telugu novelist and a journalist. He was born into a family of writers. He wrote the first horror novel in Telugu. He wrote over 90 novels in Telugu. He is best known for his detective novels.

Life 
He was born on 26 October 1926 in Tenali, Guntur district, Madras State to Venkatramaiah, Padmavathi. Venkatramaiah used to own a printing press in Tenali. He is the younger brother of famous Telugu writer Chalam. Because Chalam was adopted by his grand father his surname got changed to Gudipati. His mother Padmavathi used to play stage dramas along with Bellary Raghava. Sambasiva Rao's elder sister Varudhini is a wife of Kodavatiganti Kutumba Rao, another famous writer. His younger sister Usha Rani was the chairman of Telugu division of National Book Trust, New Delhi.

He wrote short stories at the age of 14 years. He extensively wrote between 1957–1980. He was inspired the English writer Edgar Wallace. Indian ex-prime minister P. V. Narasimha Rao used to like his writings. Popular Telugu writer Malladi Venkata Krishna Murthy is also inspired by his writings.

Writings 
He wrote first spy thriller called No.888 in Telugu. The first horror novel in Telugu Chavu Tappite Chalu was also written by him. He worked as a journalist for a magazine called Telugu Cinema. Later he ran a literatary journal called Manjusha. He is best known for his detective novels. He wrote 75 detective novels and close to 20 social novels. Close to 1 million copies of his novels were sold. Prominent character in his novels are Detective Yugandhar, and his assistant Raju, and Inspector Swarajya Rao. Background for most of the novels is Madras. 
Below is the partial list of novels written by him.

 Lakshadhikari Hatya
 Chavu Keka
 Ardha Rathri Atithi
 Uri Tadu
 Pramila Devi Hatya
 Chikatiki Veyi Kallu
 Adugo Athane Donga
 Mathi Poyina Manishi
 Nenu Chavanu
 Practical Joker
 Pramadam Jagratta
 Nuvvu Evari Kosam
 Oka Vennela Rathri
 Oka Challani Rathri
 Prapanchaniki 10 Gantallo Pramadam
 Locket Marmam
 24 Gantalalo
 28 Metlu
 Addadaruunnayi Jagratta
 Adugo Athane Hantakudu
 Adugu Padithe Apayam
 Aiduguru Anumanithulu
 Ardharatri Pilupu
 Atanu Atanu Kadu
 Chavu Tappite Chalu
 Chetulu Ettu
 Errani Gurtu
 Gana Gana Mogina Ganta
 Malli Eppudo Ekkado
 Mundu Nuyyi Venuka Goyyi
 Nannu Champakandi
 Nefalo Captain Naresh
 Nenu Nenu Kanu
 No 222
 No 333
 No 444
 No 555
 No 678
 No 777
 No 888
 No 787
 Padunu Leni Katti Gullu Leni Pistholu
 Papam Pilichindi
 Paripoyina Khaidi
 Sujatha
 Talupu Teriste Chastavu
 Valalo Chikkina Vanitha
 x808

References 

Telugu writers
1926 births
1994 deaths